Luis Blanco Garrido (born 31 May 1978) is a Spanish football manager and former player who played mainly as a right winger. He is the current manager of RCD Espanyol B.

Playing career
Born in Santa Coloma de Gramenet, Barcelona, Catalonia, Blanco was an UDA Gramenet youth graduate, and made his first team debut at the age of just 16 on 21 May 1995, coming on as a second-half substitute in a 1–1 Segunda División B home draw against Real Murcia. In the 1997–98 season, aged 19, he was already a regular starter for the side.

In 1998, Blanco moved to RCD Espanyol and was initially assigned to the reserves also in the third division. He made his first team debut on 17 July 1999, playing the last 17 minutes of a 0–2 home loss against Montpellier HSC, for the year's UEFA Intertoto Cup.

In 2001, Blanco returned to Gramenet, but left the club in January 2003 after featuring rarely during the season, and joined Tercera División side CF Badalona. In May 2010, after one promotion to the third division in the 2003–04 campaign, he left.

Blanco agreed to a deal with third division side UE Sant Andreu in July 2010, He featured regularly with the side before retiring in 2012, aged 34.

Managerial career
On 11 June 2013, Blanco was named Piti Belmonte's assistant at his former side Badalona. On 24 June 2014, he returned to another club he represented as a player, Espanyol, being appointed assistant of Lluís Planagumà at the B-team.

In 2017, Blanco was named manager of Espanyol's Juvenil A side. He was in charge of the Juvenil B team during the 2018–19 campaign before subsequently returning to the Juvenil A in 2019, and then taking over the B's on 24 March 2021, after José Aurelio Gay was sacked. 

On 13 May 2022, Blanco was named interim manager of the first team, after Vicente Moreno was sacked. His first professional – and La Liga – match in charge of the Pericos occurred the following day, a 1–1 home draw against Valencia CF.

References

External links

1978 births
Living people
People from Santa Coloma de Gramenet
Sportspeople from the Province of Barcelona
Footballers from Catalonia
Association football wingers
Segunda División B players
Tercera División players
UDA Gramenet footballers
RCD Espanyol B footballers
RCD Espanyol footballers
CF Badalona players
UE Sant Andreu footballers
Spanish football managers
La Liga managers
Segunda División B managers
Segunda Federación managers
RCD Espanyol B managers
RCD Espanyol managers